The 2013–14 season was Colchester United's 72nd season in their history and sixth successive season in the third tier of English football, League One. Alongside competing in the League One, the club also participated in the FA Cup, the League Cup and the Football League Trophy.

In Joe Dunne's first full season in charge of the club, he brought in some of his loanees from the 2012–13 season on permanent contracts, including Craig Eastmond, Sanchez Watt and Sam Walker. There was an emphasis on youth as the U's brought through a number of their Academy products and handed them their first-team debuts throughout the season. Dunne effectively secured League One football for another season in the penultimate game when they soundly beat already-promoted Brentford 4–1 before securing victory on the final day of the season at Walsall.

Colchester had a second successive season of exiting the cup competitions at the earliest possible stage following heavy defeats by Peterborough United and Dagenham & Redbridge in the League Cup and Football League Trophy respectively, while they pushed Sheffield United close in the FA Cup first round after coming back from 2–0 down at half-time to level the score before a late Sheffield penalty decided the tie.

Season overview

Pre-season
Having narrowly avoided relegation to League Two on the final day of the previous season, manager Joe Dunne began strengthening the team early in pre-season, announcing former Arsenal loanee Craig Eastmond had signed a pre-contract agreement with the club on 20 May. Dunne had already allowed Matt Heath and Jackson Ramm to search for a new club with their contracts expiring in June.

Colchester's development squad was bolstered first by the signing of Milton Keynes Dons youth-team product Mason Spence, and the news that young striker Freddie Ladapo had signed a new one-year contract to remain with the club. Goalkeeper Mark Cousins also extended his stay at the club, agreeing a new one-year contract on 14 June.

Long-serving defender John White decided to bring an end to his nine-year stay with Colchester after rejecting a reduced-terms contract offer by the club. However, last seasons joint-leading goalscorer Jabo Ibehre agreed a two-year contract extension on 17 June.

On 28 June, another former Arsenal loanee joined the club on a permanent basis when Sanchez Watt signed a two-year contract with the club. Another development squad signing was made on 2 July when former Queens Park Rangers midfielder Conor Hubble signed following a trial period at the club.

The first-team squad played their first friendly of pre-season on 10 July when they beat Heybridge Swifts 2–1. Ben Newson had given the home side a first-half lead prior to Craig Eastmond being stretchered off following a challenge from Ryan Doyle. The U's got themselves back into the game prior to the hour mark through John-Joe O'Toole following a Drey Wright assist. Wright then turned scorer with 18-minutes remaining to earn a narrow victory. On 12 July, Colchester faced AFC Sudbury and secured a 5–0 win with a brace from Sammie Szmodics and goals from triallist Phil Roberts, Marcus Bean and John-Joe O'Toole. The following day, Colchester collected another win with a 2–0 victory at Bishop's Stortford as Gavin Massey and Clinton Morrison scored.

On 16 July, Colchester signed Chelsea's Ghanaian defender Daniel Pappoe in a sixth-month loan deal, having already featured in Colchester's previous two friendly matches. They then took on West Ham United in a friendly fixture the same day. West Ham won 2–1 courtesy of goals from Joe Cole and James Collins. Jabo Ibehre scored a consolation for Colchester from a Tosin Olufemi cross with the final kick of the game.

On 19 July another Chelsea player and former loanee rejoined the club when Sam Walker signed until 19 January. He then featured in Colchester's 0–0 draw with Tottenham Hotspur at the Colchester Community Stadium that evening. The following day, the U's faced Braintree Town at Cressing Road where they won 4–1 with goals from Andy Bond, Marcus Bean, Freddie Ladapo and Ryan Melaugh. Sean Marks pulled a goal back for the home side at 3–1.

Colchester faced local rivals Ipswich Town in their next friendly on 23 July but were beaten 3–0 by the visitors. Ex-U's player Anthony Wordsworth set up Luke Chambers for the first goal, with later goals added by David McGoldrick and Daryl Murphy.

John-Joe O'Toole made a move to Bristol Rovers for an undisclosed fee on 24 July having previously spent time on loan there during the 2012–13 season. Also on 24 July, Colchester travelled to play Histon where they won 1–0 thanks to a David Wright goal.

Triallist and former-Southampton player Ryan Dickson signed a one-year contract with the club on 26 July. Meanwhile, Drey Wright also agreed a new three-year contract to keep him tied to the club until summer 2016.

On 27 July, the club played simultaneous friendlies, one game at Maldon & Tiptree and the other at Needham Market. Daniel Pappoe and Freddie Sears scored the goals against Maldon & Tiptree in a 2–1 victory, while Marcus Bean, Gavin Massey and Clinton Morrison provided the goals in a 3–0 win against Needham.

August
Colchester started the new season with a trip to Priestfield Stadium to face Gillingham on 3 August. Ryan Dickson made his debut while Craig Eastmond and Sam Walker both made their second debuts for the club. The U's snatched an 89th-minute winner from substitute Andy Bond.

For the third consecutive season, Colchester exited the League Cup at the first round stage. On 6 August they suffered a 5–1 defeat by Peterborough United at the Community Stadium. Peterborough went in at half-time with a 1–0 lead, but Ibehre scored his first goal of the season a couple of minutes after the break to level the scores. However, Peterborough scored four goals in 21 minutes to confine the U's to another early cup exit.

The U's bounced back from midweek Cup disappointment to record a second successive 1–0 league victory over Port Vale with Gavin Massey scoring the decisive goal. They then held Sheffield United to a 1–1 draw at Bramall Lane. Freddie Sears had opened the scoring following a counter-attack in the 25th minute, but the Blades equalised on the stroke of half-time when a Harry Maguire shot slipped through Sam Walker's gloves. Colchester continued their unbeaten run on 23 August as they came from behind to draw with Carlisle United. Matty Robson scored after just four minutes but Freddie Sears struck to score his second goal in as many games to rescue a point for the home side.

Colchester fell to their first league defeat of the season on 31 August to a table-topping Leyton Orient side. Each of the goals scored in the 2–1 win for the O's came from players that had played for both clubs. Ex-Colchester player Kevin Lisbie scored the winner after former U's loanee Dave Mooney had opened the scoring in the 13th-minute. Former Orient player Ibehre scored the only goal for Colchester on 35-minutes. The win gave Orient their first victory at Colchester since 1951.

September
Long serving club captain Kemal Izzet ended his 12-year stay at the club on 2 September. Having failed to make a first-team appearance in the first month of the season, both the club and player agreed to mutually cancel Izzet's contract in order for him to find regular football.

On 3 September, Colchester crashed out of the Football League Trophy by a 4–1 margin at Dagenham & Redbridge. The visitors struck first when newly-appointed captain Brian Wilson scored from a free kick in the 38th-minute.  However, Magnus Okuonghae was sent off for a second bookable offence in the 52nd-minute as former Colchester youth team product Medy Elito scored an equaliser one minute later. Goals from Dagenham in the 64th, 78th, and 85th-minutes ensured a second cup thrashing of the campaign for the U's.

Following a series of injuries and suspensions, Colchester went into their game with Coventry City with numerous changes required to the first-team squad. The game was played at Northampton Town's Sixfields Stadium due to an ongoing dispute between the club and the Ricoh Arena's. It ended 2–0 to the "home" team and Joe Dunne said that he had "no complaints" with the result considering he only had nine players available for training on the Thursday prior to the game.

In light of the injury crisis, Dunne brought in two loanees in time for the following weekends fixture against Bradford City. Incoming were winger Jeffrey Monakana from Preston North End, and full back Luke Garbutt from Everton as cover for Ryan Dickson who had been suffering from a virus in recent weeks. In the match on 14 September, the U's fell behind to a Nahki Wells goal after 15 minutes, but Monakana scored on his debut to level the scores on 28 minutes. Jabo Ibehre scored his third goal of the season four minutes later, but after the break Wells struck again. Daniel Pappoe came on for Alex Gilbey on 86 minutes to make his professional debut, but just four minutes later he was sent off for a tackle on former Colchester player Mark Yeates.

Following Pappoe's red card, further defensive reinforcement was required as Dunne recruited Queens Park Rangers' Northern Ireland under-21 international Jamie Sendles-White and Bradford's Matt Taylor on one-month loan deals.

On 21 September, Colchester hosted Crawley Town at the Community Stadium. Freddie Sears scored on six minutes but the visitors levelled after half-an-hour through Emile Sinclair to draw 1–1.

Matt Taylor scored in just his second appearance for the club in their 1–1 draw with Bristol City at Ashton Gate Stadium on 28 September, a game which saw the debut of Academy graduate Sammie Szmodics who came on as a late substitute for Craig Eastmond. The result left Colchester without a win in six games.

October
Colchester hosted promotion-favourites Wolverhampton Wanderers on 5 October as a team featuring a number of emergency loanees and youth-team products were beaten 3–0. A home game against Walsall followed on 12 October. Freddie Sears scored after seven minutes with his fourth goal of the season, but Walsall scored an equaliser in the sixth minute of injury time to draw 1–1.

Brentford beat Colchester 3–1 on 19 October. After Magnus Okuonghae had scored his first goal of the season, Brentford scored three goals in ten minutes in the second half to seal victory. The U's then travelled to Shrewsbury Town on 22 October where Marcus Bean scored his first goal for the club in a game which ended 1–1, extending Colchester's winless run to eleven games, while another Academy graduate Macauley Bonne made his first-team debut.

Making his home debut on his birthday on 26 October, Macauley Bonne scored his first professional goal against Peterborough United eight minutes after coming on as a substitute for Clinton Morrison to end the U's winless streak with a 1–0 victory.

November
Rotherham United hosted the U's and held them to a 2–2 draw on 2 November after both sides had taken a lead in the game. Marcus Bean scored after seven minutes but Colchester conceded two minutes later to a Matt Tubbs goal. Kieran Agard gave the hosts the lead on 22-minutes, but Elliot Lee scored an equaliser, his first in professional football, in second half injury time.

In the FA Cup first round, Colchester were drawn at home to Sheffield United. The visitors had a two goal lead after twelve minutes, but a second-half revival brought the U's back into the match. Macauley Bonne capped his first professional start with a goal three minutes after the break. Then, Everton loanee Luke Garbutt scored from 25-yards to draw level on 64 minutes. A contentious penalty decision against Magnus Okuonghae for hand-ball allowed Chris Porter to score the winner in a 3–2 victory.

Colchester resumed League One activities on 16 November at home to Swindon Town and lost 2–1 with a Magnus Okuonghae goal their consolation as it left the U's with one win in 16 games in all competitions. On 23 November, they faced Preston in a game which Colchester could only manage one shot on target. They did however scrape a 1–1 draw from the match in which Preston attempted 26 shots, Luke Garbutt with the U's goal.

On 26 November, Colchester won their first game of the month when they defeated Milton Keynes Dons 3–1 at home. Craig Eastmond scored his first of the season, while Jabo Ibehre and Macauley Bonne both scored after coming on as substitutes. They then travelled to Birkenhead to take on Tranmere Rovers on 30 November where they were beaten 2–1 with two goals for Ryan Lowe securing victory for the home side and Clinton Morrison scored his first of the season in stoppage time.

December
Following a two-week break for the FA Cup second round in which Colchester did not take part, the U's faced bottom of the table Notts County at the Community Stadium on 14 December. The visitors scored two goals in either half to hand Colchester their heaviest defeat of the season. Colchester then travelled to another team struggling in the league to face Oldham Athletic on 21 December. They achieved their first away victory since the opening day of the season win against Gillingham, winning 2–0 through an own goal from Latics defender Ellis Plummer and then Jabo Ibehre's fifth goal of the season.

On Boxing Day, Joe Dunne enjoyed his biggest win as Colchester manager when the U's beat Stevenage 4–0 at home. Colchester's goals came from West Ham loanee Blair Turgott, Jabo Ibehre, Craig Eastmond in the first half hour and Eastmond added a second later in the second half.

In the final game of 2013 on 29 December, Colchester hosted Crewe Alexandra, now bottom of the league. After taking the lead through a deflected Luke Garbutt free kick, Crewe pulled two goals back in three second-half minutes to consign Colchester to a 2–1 defeat.

January
Colchester drew 0–0 with Milton Keynes Dons on New Year's Day.

Andy Bond was then released from his contract after three-and-a-half years with the club, while Dunne offered a deal to keep Dominic Vose with the club until the end of the season after joining on a rolling contract in November.

On 11 January, Colchester beat Gillingham 3–0 as Sanchez Watt scored his first goal of the season, while Clinton Morrison scored his second of the season and Freddie Sears marked his return from injury with a late goal.

On 16 January, the club announced Alex Gilbey had signed a contract extension to remain with the club until summer 2016. This followed news that Joe Dunne had offered a permanent contract to on-loan Chelsea goalkeeper Sam Walker.

Colchester won 4–2 at Brunton Park against Carlisle United on 18 January to move back into the top-half of the League One table. Sanchez Watt scored a first-half brace, separated only by a Magnus Okuonghae own goal. Marcus Bean scored Colchester's third in the second half and Max Ehmer also scored an own goal to make it 4–1 to the U's. Ehmer later redeemed himself late on to finalise a 4–2 scoreline.

Two days following victory at Carlisle, Sam Walker signed a permanent 18-month contract with the club. The January transfer window also saw the departure of youth-team graduate Freddie Ladapo, who left for Conference club Kidderminster Harriers. Colchester additionally signed Leicester City under-21 captain Alie Sesay on loan until the end of the season to provide cover for Magnus Okuonghae and Tom Eastman.

February
After three consecutive postponed games due to waterlogged pitches following heavy rain, Colchester played their first game for 24 days when they were visitors at Port Vale on 11 February. The game ended 2–0 to Vale, with two goals from Doug Loft. Colchester's game at Swindon on 14 February went ahead following a pitch inspection less than one hour before kick off. Sanchez Watt, playing on his birthday, was sent off as Colchester held on for a goalless draw.

On 22 February, Colchester played their first home game since 11 January when they faced Preston. After trailing 1–0 at the break, Jabo Ibehre scored his sixth goal of the season to level the score but an own goal from captain Brian Wilson in the final ten minutes of the match gave Preston a 2–1 win. Colchester then suffered another home defeat on 25 February when another late Chris Porter penalty confined them to a 1–0 defeat to Sheffield United.

March
Colchester lost 2–1 at league leaders Leyton Orient on 1 March. Dave Mooney opened the scoring for the O's on 21 minutes, but Marcus Bean's fourth goal of the season eleven minutes from time levelled the score. Four minutes later Moses Odubajo scored the winner. Sanchez Watt had a goal disallowed and hit the bar during Colchester's 0–0 draw with Rotherham United on 4 March. Colchester then earned their first win in six games with a 2–1 home victory over Coventry on 8 March. Freddie Sears scored after five minutes with his sixth of the season, before Gavin Massey doubled the U's advantage midway through the first-half. Callum Wilson pulled a goal back for the visitors just before half-time but Colchester held on for the win in the second half.

On 11 March, Bradford City won 2–0 at the Community Stadium, followed by a 1–0 defeat at Crawley Town on 15 March. The U's then hosted Shrewsbury on 18 March and beat them 1–0 with Colchester's goal coming from Jabo Ibehre.

Colchester came from two goals down to earn a 2–2 draw with Bristol City on 22 March courtesy of Gavin Massey and Freddie Sears goals. On 25 March, they travelled to Wolverhampton to face leaders Wolves at Molineux Stadium, where the U's found themselves 3–0 down at half-time. A spirited fight back reduced the deficit to just one goal after Alex Gilbey and David Wright's first goals for the club. However, Nouha Dicko completed the scoring in second-half injury time to inflict a 4–2 defeat on Colchester. Colchester were again defeated by Notts County, this time at Meadow Lane on 29 March when they were beaten 2–0, leaving the U's to their fourth consecutive away defeat and only three points above the relegation zone.

April
Colchester registered no shots on target as their attack faltered during their 2–0 defeat at Peterborough on 2 April. A fourth successive defeat followed at home to Tranmere on 5 April as the visitors won 2–1, Freddie Sears with Colchester's goal. The result left Colchester two places above the relegation zone on goal difference alone. Tranmere had been forced to wear Colchester's gold away kit after the match referee deemed Tranmere's sky blue away kit a clash with the home sides blue and white stripes.

On 12 April, with the club now embroiled in a relegation battle, Colchester face 24th-placed Stevenage. After falling behind in the eleventh minute to a Michael Doughty goal, Colchester led 3–1 by the 73rd-minute after two goals from Freddie Sears and one from Jabo Ibehre. Luke Freeman pulled a goal back in the 89th minute for the home side but they then had Filipe Morais sent off for fighting in stoppage time. The win increased the gap to three points to the relegation zone with only four games of the season remaining. A 1–0 defeat to Oldham on Good Friday put the U's firmly back in the relegation picture, leaving them two points outside of the drop zone. They then drew 0–0 with relegation rivals Crewe Alexandra on Easter Monday to leave both sides just one point clear of the relegation zone.

On 26 April, Colchester effectively sealed their League One status for another season by beating already-promoted Brentford 4–1 in an impressive performance at the Community Stadium. They U's were 3–0 ahead within 41 minutes with goals from Marcus Bean, Alex Wynter and a Freddie Sears penalty. Brentford got a goal back just before the interval, but Sears secured the win in the second half with another goal. Alex Gilbey then brought down Alan Judge in the penalty area but Judge had his resulting spot kick saved by Sam Walker. The result meant that Colchester were not mathematically safe, but their goal difference to the teams surrounding them meant that only a large defeat for the U's the following week at Walsall and high scores for their rivals would spell relegation to League Two.

May
In their final game of the season, the U's travelled to Walsall and secured a 1–0 victory after James Chambers' attempted clearance struck Craig Eastmond and flew into the net. The win meant Colchester ended the season in 16th position in League One.

Players

Transfers

In

 Total spending:  ~ £0

Out

 Total incoming:  ~ £0

Loans in

Loans out

Contracts
New contracts and contract extensions.

Match details

Friendlies

League One

League table

Results round by round

Matches

Football League Cup

Football League Trophy

FA Cup

Squad statistics

Appearances and goals

|-
!colspan="16"|Players who appeared for Colchester who left during the season

|}

Goalscorers

Disciplinary record

Captains
Number of games played as team captain.

Clean sheets
Number of games goalkeepers kept a clean sheet.

Player debuts
Players making their first-team Colchester United debut in a fully competitive match.

Honours and awards
Players to receive awards at the club's End of Season Awards Dinner held on 9 May 2014.

See also
List of Colchester United F.C. seasons

References

General

Specific

2013-14
2013–14 Football League One by team